Randi Monsen (18 February 1910 – 24 August 1997) was a Norwegian illustrator. She was born in Hamar; the daughter of politician Fredrik Monsen and a sister of Per Monsen. She worked for the newspaper Arbeiderbladet from 1935 to 1980. She has illustrated several books, and is represented at the National Gallery of Norway.

References

1910 births
1997 deaths
People from Hamar
Norwegian illustrators